The Queen's Own Dorset Yeomanry was a yeomanry regiment of the British Army founded in 1794 as the Dorsetshire Regiment of Volunteer Yeomanry Cavalry in response to the growing threat of invasion during the Napoleonic wars. It gained its first royal association in 1833 as The Princess Victoria's Regiment of Dorset Yeomanry Cavalry, and its second, in 1843, as the Queen's Own Regiment of Dorset Yeomanry Cavalry.

History

Formation and early history
Under threat of invasion by the French Revolutionary government from 1793, and with insufficient military forces to repulse such an attack, the British government under William Pitt the Younger decided in 1794 to increase the Militia and to form corps of volunteers for the defence of the country. The mounted arm of the volunteers became known as the "Gentlemen and Yeomanry Cavalry".

The Dorset Yeomanry was first raised on 9 May 1794 as the Dorsetshire Regiment of Volunteer Yeomanry Cavalry of six troops. In 1796,  it became the Dorsetshire Rangers and now consisted of ten troops. In 1802, it was disbanded as a result of the Treaty of Amiens and the consequent peace.

With the ending of the Peace of Amiens in 1803, the regiment was re-raised as the Dorsetshire Regiment of Volunteer Yeomanry Cavalry, consisting of seven troops. In 1814, it was once again disbanded.

The next, and longest lived, incarnation came in 1830 when the Dorsetshire Regiment of Volunteer Yeomanry Cavalry was reformed from troops at Wimborne, Blandford, Isle of Purbeck, Wareham and Charborough. In 1833 it gained royal patronage as The Princess Victoria's Regiment of Dorset Yeomanry Cavalry and in June 1843 became the Queen's Own Regiment of Dorset Yeomanry Cavalry. At some point thereafter it was renamed as the Dorset Yeomanry (Queen's Own) with headquarters at Dorchester.

On 1 April 1893, the troops were reorganised into squadrons, and the headquarters moved to Weymouth.

Second Boer War
On 13 December 1899, the decision to allow volunteer forces to serve in the Second Boer War was made. Due to the string of defeats during Black Week in December, 1899, the British government realized they were going to need more troops than just the regular army, thus issuing a Royal Warrant on 24 December 1899. This warrant officially created the Imperial Yeomanry. The Royal Warrant asked standing Yeomanry regiments to provide service companies of approximately 115 men each. In addition to this, many British citizens (usually mid-upper class) volunteered to join the new regiment.

The first contingent of recruits contained 550 officers, 10,371 men with 20 battalions and 4 companies, which arrived in South Africa between February and April, 1900. On arrival, the regiment was sent throughout the zone of operations. The Queen's Own Dorset Yeomanry provided troops for the 26th Company, 7th Battalion, fighting at the Relief of Wepener, Battle of Doornkop, Battle of Diamond Hill, Capture of Pretoria, Battle of Boschfontein, Battle of Nooitgedacht, and the Battle of Middelfontein along with many other patrols and skirmishes.
 
 

On 17 April 1901, the regiment was renamed as the Dorsetshire Imperial Yeomanry (Queen's Own) and reorganised in four squadrons and a machine gun section. In 1902, the headquarters moved to Sherborne. On 1 April 1908, the regiment was renamed for the final time as the Dorset Yeomanry (Queen's Own) and transferred to the Territorial Force, trained and equipped as hussars. The regiment was based at Priestlands Crescent in Sherborne at this time (since demolished).

The regiment's organisation was:
 

It was ranked as 23rd (of 55) in the order of precedence of the Yeomanry Regiments in the Army List of 1914.

First World War

In accordance with the Territorial and Reserve Forces Act 1907 (7 Edw. 7, c.9) which brought the Territorial Force into being, the TF was intended to be a home defence force for service during wartime and members could not be compelled to serve outside the country. However, on the outbreak of war on 4 August 1914, many members volunteered for Imperial Service. Therefore, TF units were split in August and September 1914 into 1st Line (liable for overseas service) and 2nd Line (home service for those unable or unwilling to serve overseas) units. Later, a 3rd Line was formed to act as a reserve, providing trained replacements for the 1st and 2nd Line regiments.

1/1st Queen's Own Dorset Yeomanry
The 1st Line regiment was mobilised in August 1914 and attached to the 1st South Western Mounted Brigade. In September 1914, It was transferred to the 2nd South Midland Mounted Brigade, 2nd Mounted Division.

In 1915, it was deployed overseas to Egypt, then onwards to participate in the Dardanelles campaign, where it served as dismounted troops and was involved in the Battle of Gallipoli, the Battle of Sari Bair and the Battle of Scimitar Hill.

After the evacuation of Gallipoli, it returned to Egypt in January 1916 and became part of the 6th Mounted Brigade, an independent brigade that was involved in the action of Agagia in February 1916. At this battle, the retreating Senussi were attacked by the Dorset Yeomanry with drawn swords across open ground. Under fire, the Yeomanry lost half their horses, and about a third of their men and officers were casualties (58 of the 184 who took part). Colonel Soutar, leading the regiment in this charge, had his horse shot from under him and was knocked unconscious. When he came to, he found himself alone amongst a group of the enemy. He drew his revolver, shot several, and took the Turkish leader Jaffir Pasha prisoner.

In February 1917, 6th Mounted Brigade joined the Imperial Mounted Division and took part in the First and Second Battles of Gaza. I, June 1917, it was transferred to the Yeomanry Mounted Division for the Third Battle of Gaza and the Battle of Beersheba.

In July 1918, the Brigade was re-designated the 10th Cavalry Brigade and the Division the 4th Cavalry Division. The Regiment remained with them in Palestine until the end of the war.

2/1st Queen's Own Dorset Yeomanry
The 2nd Line regiment was formed at Sherborne in September 1914. In May 1915, it was at Chippenham, where it joined the 2/1st South Western Mounted Brigade, then it moved to Maresfield in September. In October 1915, it joined the 1/1st South Western Mounted Brigade (replacing the 1/1st Royal Wiltshire Yeomanry) and the brigade was redesignated as 2/1st Southern Mounted Brigade. On 31 March 1916, the remaining Mounted Brigades were ordered to be numbered in a single sequence; the brigade became the 16th Mounted Brigade and joined 4th Mounted Division at Manningtree.

In July 1916, there was a major reorganization of 2nd Line yeomanry units in the United Kingdom. All but 12 regiments were converted to cyclists and as a consequence the regiment was dismounted and joined the 7th Cyclist Brigade (and the division became 2nd Cyclist Division) at Woodbridge.

Further reorganization in November 1916 saw the 2nd Cyclist Division broken up and the regiment was remounted at Maidstone, taking over the horses of the 2/1st Queen's Own West Kent Yeomanry and replacing it in 3rd Mounted Brigade in the new 1st Mounted Division (3rd Mounted Division redesignated). In March 1917, it was at Sevenoaks.

In September 1917, the regiment was converted back to cyclists, this time in 13th Cyclist Brigade in The Cyclist Division, still at Sevenoaks. In December 1917, the 13th Cyclist Brigade was broken up and in early 1918 the regiment moved to Ireland, joining the 6th Cyclist Brigade at The Curragh. There were no further changes before the end of the war.

3/1st Queen's Own Dorset Yeomanry
The 3rd Line regiment was formed in 1915 and in the summer was affiliated to a Reserve Cavalry Regiment at Tidworth. In July 1916, it was affiliated to the 8th Reserve Cavalry Regiment at The Curragh and in early 1917 it was absorbed into the 2nd Reserve Cavalry Regiment, also at The Curragh.

Between the wars
On 7 February 1920, the Regiment was reconstituted in the Territorial Army with HQ still at Sherborne. Following the experience of the war, it was decided that only the fourteen most senior yeomanry regiments would be retained as horsed cavalry, with the rest being transferred to other roles. As a result, on 25 January 1922, the Regiment was transferred to the Royal Artillery to form two batteries375 (Dorset Yeomanry) Battery at Blandford and 376 (Dorset Yeomanry) Battery (Howitzer) at Sherbornethat joined the 94th (Somerset Yeomanry) Brigade, RFA to form the 94th (Somerset and Dorset Yeomanry) Brigade, RFA, soon being renamed as the 94th (Dorset and Somerset Yeomanry) Brigade, RFA.  This was a short-lived marriage, the Somerset Yeomanry batteries being moved to 55th (Wessex) Army Field Brigade, RA in July 1929.

At this time (July 1929) the regiment was renamed as the 94th (Queen's Own Dorset Yeomanry) Army Field Brigade, RA with headquarters at Dorchester. It was joined by 224 (Dorset) Battery at Dorchester, transferred from 56 (Wessex) Field Brigade, RA. Some time in the 1930s, 375 Battery moved to Shaftesbury. In February 1938, the regiment gained 218 (Bournemouth) Battery at Bournemouth, which was transferred from 95 (Hampshire) Field Brigade, RA. The final change in title came on 1 November 1938 as artillery brigades became regiments, hence 94th (Queen's Own Dorset Yeomanry) Field Regiment, RA.

In 1939, the Territorial Army was "duplicated"existing units formed a second unit. 375 and 376 batteries transferred to the duplicate 141st Field Regiment, RA. 94th Field Regiment, RA retained 218 and 224 batteries.

Second World War
In 1938, field regiments were organised into two 12-gun batteries. The experience of the BEF in 1940 showed the problem with this organisation: field regiments were intended to support an infantry brigade of three battalions. This could not be managed without severe disruption to the regiment. As a result, field regiments were reorganised into three 8-gun batteries.

94th (Queen's Own Dorset Yeomanry) Field Regiment, RA
94th (Queen's Own Dorset Yeomanry) Field Regiment served in the Home Forces for most of the war, taking part in the North West Europe Campaign from June 1944.

At the outbreak of the war, 94th Field Regiment was part of 43rd (Wessex) Infantry Division. Initially commanding two batteries218 (Bournemouth) at Bournemouth and 224 (Dorset) Battery at Dorchesterthe third battery (468) was formed in the regiment on 27 February 1941.

It remained in the United Kingdom until June 1944, when it was deployed to France, still with the 43rd (Wessex) Infantry Division. It remained with 43rd Division until the end of the war.

141st (Queen's Own Dorset Yeomanry) Field Regiment, RA
141st (Queen's Own Dorset Yeomanry) Field Regiment served in the Home Forces throughout the war.

At the outbreak of the war, 141st Field Regiment was also part of 43rd (Wessex) Infantry Division. Initially commanding two batteries375 (Dorset Yeomanry) at Shaftesbury and 376 (Dorset Yeomanry) at Sherbornethe third battery (505) was formed in the regiment on 27 February 1941. It was authorised to use the "Queen's Own Dorset Yeomanry" designation from 17 February 1942.

It transferred to the 9th Armoured Division in June 1942, 55th Infantry Division in August 1944 and finally to 61st Infantry Division in June 1945.

Post war
In 1947, the Regiment was reformed in the Territorial Army as two artillery regiments-the 294th (Queen's Own Dorset Yeomanry) Field Regiment RA and the 341st (Queen’s Own Dorset Yeomanry) Medium Regiment RA. On 1 July 1950, the two regiments were amalgamated as the 294th. In 1961, the regiment merged with the 255th (West Somerset Yeomanry and Dorset Garrison) Medium Regiment RA, forming the 250th (Queen's Own Dorset and West Somerset Yeomanry) Medium Regiment RAthe Dorsets' title was passed to P Battery. In February 1967, the new regiment was disbanded and some of its personnel used to form two infantry companies. The final parade was held on Sunday, 26 February. The salute was taken by the Lord Lieutenant of Somerset, Lord Hylton.

Dorset Yeomanry
In 1997, an Armoured Replacement Regiment was formed at Bovington and called 'The Dorset Yeomanry'. This new regiment did not inherit the lineage and battle honours of the Queen's Own Dorset Yeomanry. In 1999, this regiment was reduced to a single squadron, which became "A" (Dorset Yeomanry) Squadron of the Royal Wessex Yeomanry. The other squadrons of this regiment are formed by other old yeomanry regiments that had been reduced to the strength of one squadron:
B (Royal Wiltshire Yeomanry) [RWY] Squadron
C (Royal Gloucestershire Hussars) [RGH] Squadron
D (Royal Devon Yeomanry) [RDY] Squadron

The Regiment has three roles:
 B, C and D Squadronsprovide replacement Challenger 2 turret crewmen to the Regular Army.
 Regimental Headquarters and A (Dorset Yeomanry) Armour Replacement Squadrondevelop Armour Replacement doctrine and provide the infrastructure to support the Logistic brigades.

Battle honours
The Queen's Own Dorset Yeomanry was awarded the following battle honours (honours in bold are emblazoned on the regimental colours):

Uniforms
During the period 1830 to 1847, the regiment wore a shako with scarlet coatee and blue facings. After 1850, a dark blue tunic was introduced and in 1883 a hussar style uniform, complete with white looped braiding and busby, was adopted. Following the Boer War a khaki uniform with green facings replaced the blue uniforms, to be worn with a slouch hat. This practical dress proved unpopular for recruiting purposes and, by 1908, officers had for full dress reverted to the 19th century dark blue hussar uniform, with silver braiding, scarlet facings and plumed busby. Other ranks had plainer "blues" for parade and walking out dress. Subsequently, khaki service and battle dress of standard British Army pattern was worn for nearly all occasions.

See also

 Imperial Yeomanry
 List of Yeomanry Regiments 1908
 Yeomanry
 Yeomanry order of precedence
 British yeomanry during the First World War
 Second line yeomanry regiments of the British Army
 List of British Army Yeomanry Regiments converted to Royal Artillery

References

Bibliography 
 
 
 
 
 
 
 
 Norman E.H. Litchfield, The Territorial Artillery 19081988 (Their Lineage, Uniforms and Badges), Nottingham: Sherwood Press, 1992, .
 
 
 Titles and Designations of Formations and Units of the Territorial Army, London: War Office, 7 November 1927 (RA sections also summarised in Litchfield, Appendix IV).

External links
 
 
 Roll of 26th Company, 7th Battalion, Imperial Yeomanry

 
Queen's Own Dorset
Yeomanry regiments of the British Army in World War I
Military units and formations established in 1794
1794 establishments in Great Britain
Military units and formations in Dorset
Sherborne
Regiments of the British Army in World War II